Rolando V. de la Rosa, O.P., is the Provincial Archivist of the Dominican Province of the Philippines.

Formerly, he served as the Rector Magnificus of the University of Santo Tomas (UST), the oldest and the largest Catholic university in Asia. A religious leader and a seasoned educator, he was appointed by President Gloria Macapagal Arroyo as the chairman of the Commission on Higher Education in 2004.

Early years and education
de la Rosa was born on June 27, 1953, in Manila where he spent his childhood. He completed his basic education courses at the Aquinas University in Rawis, Legazpi City, studied AB Philosophy and graduated magna cum laude from the Dominican House of Studies. He also graduated magna cum laude from the University of Santo Tomas with a degree in Bachelor of Sacred Theology in 1980. He was ordained priest in the Dominican Order on April 3, 1982.

In 1984, Fr. de la Rosa earned his Licentiate in Sacred Theology degree, magna cum laude, and Master of Arts in higher religious studies, summa cum laude, both from UST. In the Katholieke Universiteit Leuven in Belgium, he completed the doctoral degrees, graduating magna cum laude in two programs: higher religious studies and sacred theology, in 1988.

Career
He served his first two terms as rector of the University of Santo Tomas for eight years, from 1990 to 1998. His aims as rector and president were to develop the university's research capabilities, and expand their outreach programs for community service. He established the Research and Endowment Foundation Incorporated to generate funds to finance continuing research activities in the university. Through this foundation, he was able to generate enough funds to establish the Thomas Aquinas Research Complex that houses today the various research centers in the university as well as the Graduate School. To strengthen and expand the community outreach programs of the university, he established the Office for Community Development which later evolved into the UST SIMBAHAYAN, the umbrella project for all university outreach programs focused on five K's: Karunungan (Knowledge transfer), Kalusugan (Medical missions), Kabuhayan (livelihood projects), Kanlungan (housing projects for the poor and those affected by natural disasters), and Kapayapaan (peace education for communities torn by religious and other conflicts.

As Rector, he became president of the Association of Catholic Universities of the Philippines and a two-time President of the ICUSTA International Council of Universities of Saint Thomas Aquinas. He was the founding president of the DOMNET (Network of Dominican Schools, Colleges and Universities in the Philippines) in 1995. He was chair of the Organizing Committee of the International Youth Forum for the World Youth Day in 1995.

He held various positions in the Dominican Province of the Philippines like Master of Novices, Diffinitor of the Provincial Chapter, Provincial Councilor, as well as Rector of the Colegio de San Juan de Letran Calamba.

In 2008, he was again appointed by the Master of the Dominican Order as Rector Magnificus of the University of Santo Tomas (2008–2012).

He had received numerous awards for his professional and civic achievements, like the National Book Award in History, the Catholic Authors Award, the Outstanding Manilan Award (1995 and 2011), Kyung Hee University (Korea) Medal of Highest Honor, and the 2012 Outstanding CEO Award in Education.

Fr. de la Rosa has written hundreds of articles and scholarly treatises, some of which has been translated into German and French, or anthologized in international publications. His book "Beginnings of the Filipino Dominicans" won the National Book Award in History in 1991.

References

 Total Awards Biography of Fr. de la Rosa

1953 births
Living people
Filipino Dominicans
Academic staff of the University of Santo Tomas
University of Santo Tomas alumni
Filipino Roman Catholic theologians
Bicolano people
People from Manila
People from Legazpi, Albay
Chairpersons of the Commission on Higher Education of the Philippines
Arroyo administration cabinet members
Rector Magnificus of the University of Santo Tomas